is an architectural style that emerged from the Eclecticism in architecture movement of the late 19th and early 20th century, which intentionally incorporated Japanese architectural and Western architectural components into one building design.

The style emerged in Yokohama in the 1853–1867 Bakumatsu period, and spread throughout Japan after the 1868 Meiji Restoration, and then to Asian and Western countries during the expansion of the Empire of Japan.

This architectural style is characterised by both components of enlightenment Western-style architecture and components of historically emblematic traditional Japanese architecture.

History

The earliest examples of Japanese-Western Eclectic Architecture were built by the French government as part of the Japonism artistic movement's influence on French architecture. 
The term Japanese-Western Eclectic Architecture had been used by Waseda University sociologist Wajiro Kon, in his 1925 survey of housing recently built along the Chūō Main Line in Tokyo. Wajiro reviewed 588 houses built in 1921 near Asagaya Station and categorised them as Japanese Style, Culture Style, and Japanese Western Style respectively. In Kon's original thesis, the single criterion that needed to be met for classifying a house as Japanese Western Eclectic Architecture was the inclusion of a Western style .

Examples of Japanese-Western Eclectic Architectural Styles
The Japanese-Western Eclectic Architecture emerged in the final years of the Edo period in Yokohama, and then spread to other parts of Japan. The development of the style started with early architectural examples from Yokohama.

Bakumatsu Period Yokohama
These examples were built within the  jurisdiction, where the military Bakumatsu government had allowed concessions to foreign governments.

Post Meiji Restoration

References 

Japanese architectural styles
Architectural styles
Eclectic architecture